Xavier Ruffin (born January 14, 1988) is an American film director, writer, illustrator, motion graphics and title designer. He is currently President at Dopamine Productions. He is best known for writing, directing and producing the independent web series Mad Black Men.

Biography
Ruffin, who is African-American, was born on January 14, 1988, in Little Rock, Arkansas, the son of Gwli McHenry Ruffin and James Edward Ruffin. At the age of three, Ruffin's parents moved to Milwaukee, Wisconsin, where he currently resides. Ruffin exhibited a passion for music and the arts at a very young age. In the third grade he was featured in a local magazine along with his school band as a young blues guitar player, though he actually he played the cello.  In high school he was enrolled in the International Baccalaureate program and showed a strong inclination to drawing and visual art. Growing up in Milwaukee, one of the nation's most segregated cities, would later influence and inspire Ruffin to push boundaries and challenge perceptions in his creative works.

Career

As a teen, he was accepted into a pre-college program at Milwaukee Institute of Art and Design to pursue his artistic goals, where he later received a BFA. He was later hired as an adjunct professor there teaching typography at the age of 25. He began his design career at Kohl's© where he helped create internet ads as well as layouts for Kohls.com. In 2013 Ruffin was contacted by a Dailymotion executive who saw his work on music video spoofs via YouTube and worked for the company as a preferred content creator.  He then earned backing from Dailymotion to launch the web series Mad Black Men through the company's Motion Maker's Fund Grant. Ruffin got connected with Robert Townsend, who advised and helped pull the cast and crew.

Xavier has animation, vfx, title design, and director credits on music videos with Riff Raff (rapper), T.I., Donald Glover, OG Maco, Mac Miller, Gerald Walker, and others.

Music Video Videography

as Director 

as Animator 

as Editor 

as Writer 

as Title Designer

as VFX

as Animation Director (1)

as Art Director (1)

Filmography

s Director (2)

as Editor (2)

as Writer (2)

References

Living people
1988 births